The College of West Anglia (often abbreviated to CoWA or CWA) is a four-campus college of further and higher education in Cambridgeshire and Norfolk, England. The college has three campuses, located in King's Lynn, Milton and Wisbech, Cambridgeshire, as well as a sports campus at Alive Lynnsport in King's Lynn. The college has more than 10,000 students and 800 staff.

The college is the result of mergers of smaller colleges. King's Lynn Technical School (founded in 1894), King's Lynn, Norfolk. A merger with the Cambridgeshire College of Agriculture and Horticulture to form the College of West Anglia in 1998. A merger with the Isle College, Wisbech (founded 1955), Isle of Ely, Cambridgeshire in 2006, retaining the College of West Anglia name.

Overview
The College of West Anglia educates over 10,000 full-time and part-time students each academic year, across a wide range of vocational and academic fields. In addition to full-time and part-time courses, the college also offers bespoke training for local businesses, apprenticeships and higher education courses, run in partnership with Anglia Ruskin University. The college has around 800 members of staff working across the three main campuses, and its other premises.

Under the previous Ofsted inspection criteria, the college was rated outstanding (grade 1) in 2007-2008. The most recent Ofsted inspection in 2013 ranks it as good (grade 2), making it one of the best performing colleges in the country under the new criteria.

Campuses
In 2009, building work commenced on the existing sites in King's Lynn, Milton and Wisbech at a cost of over £35 million. The work includes two new technology centres at King's Lynn and Wisbech, both of which opened in 2013, a renovation of the tower block at King's Lynn and redevelopment at the Milton campus, including a bespoke higher education area.

In 2012, the college moved its sport provision to Lynnsport and Leisure Centre, in collaboration with King's Lynn and West Norfolk borough council. In association with Freebridge Community Housing and the Benjamin Foundation, the college's foundation studies is provision is located at separate premises in King's Lynn. The college received a £1.75m grant from the government in 2012 to develop a creative arts centre specialising in TV, film and performing arts at the King's Lynn campus.

In the same year, the college also announced plans to begin a £10 million refurbishment project on its "Tower Block" building within the King's Lynn campus. The plan includes the replacement of all the windows within the building, re-cladding the exterior and building an extension to the ground floor for a new student restaurant and social area.

History 
The college was founded in 1894 as the King's Lynn Technical School. In 1973 it was renamed The Norfolk College of Arts and Technology, commonly abbreviated to "Norcat". In 1998, Norcat merged with the Cambridgeshire College of Agriculture & Horticulture, which added a land-based provision in Cambridgeshire. The revised institution adopted the name, College of West Anglia. In April 2006, Isle College in Wisbech was added in a further merger, to form the current, enlarged College of West Anglia.

Principal
The college's principal is David Pomfret. Pomfret joined the college in 2005, having previously been principal of Boston College. He has a background in education and training, having worked as a lecturer in business studies. Pomfret represents the college on a wide variety of professional and educational boards within Norfolk and Cambridgeshire.

Notable alumni
 Martin Brundle - racing driver and commentator 
 Barbara Parker - track and field athlete for Team GB
 Dan Ashworth - professional footballer, FA director of elite development
 Dom Dwyer - professional footballer, Sporting Kansas City
 Stephen Fry - comedian and actor 
 Andy Hunt - former professional footballer
 Deaf Havana - alternative rock band 
 Samantha Chapman - make-up artist
 Sarah Gillespie - Singer Songwriter

References

External links 
 The College of West Anglia

Further education colleges in Norfolk
Educational institutions established in 1894
Learning and Skills Beacons
King's Lynn
1894 establishments in England